Daniel Cullen (27 April 1889 – 21 July 1971) was an Australian cricketer. He played two first-class matches for New South Wales between 1912/13 and 1913/14.

See also
 List of New South Wales representative cricketers

References

External links
 

1889 births
1971 deaths
Australian cricketers
New South Wales cricketers
Cricketers from Sydney